IAPT is an initialism that can mean:

 International Association for Plant Taxonomy
 Indian Association of Physics Teachers
 Improving Access to Psychological Therapies - a United Kingdom government policy to improve access to psychological therapies